Inside Is Love is an album by Leon Ware released in 1979. This was his third solo album and his only release for TK Records' Fabulous subsidy.

Background

Inside Is Love was produced primarily by Leon Ware, with Ron Roker producing one track, "Small Café".  The album included Ware's own version of the Minnie Riperton hit "Inside Your Love", which he had co-written with Riperton and Richard Rudolph. The lead single, "What's Your Name", peaked at No. 42 on the Billboard Hot Soul Singles chart, becoming his biggest hit as a solo artist. "Inside Your Love" was released as a follow-up but did not chart.

Track listing
 What's Your Name – (Leon Ware)	4:10
 Inside Your Love – (Leon Ware, Minnie Riperton, Richard Rudolph)	4:35
 Love Is a Simple Thing – (Marcos Valle, Robert Lamm)	3:03
 Small Café – (Leon Ware, Ron Roker)	3:43
 Club Sashay – (Leon Ware, Melissa Manchester)	3:29
 Try It Out – (Allee Willis, Leon Ware)	3:56
 Love Will Run Away – (Elkie Brooks, Leon Ware)	4:36
 On the Island – (Adrienne Anderson, Leon Ware)	4:31
 Hungry – (Adrienne Anderson, David Blumberg, Leon Ware)	3:56

Personnel

 Leon Ware – lead and background vocals, electric piano
 Criss Hall, Michael King, Sonny Burke – piano
 Pete Robinson – synthesizer
 Eddie Watkins, Frank McDonah, Scott Lipsker – bass
 Bruce Fisher, Chris Roe, David T. Walker, Wah Wah Watson – guitar
 Ed Green, Graham Jarvis, Jeff Holman – drums
 Holden Raphael, Paulinho Da Costa – percussion
 Deborah Thomas, Julia Waters, Maxine Waters, Melissa Manchester, Oren Waters  – background vocals
 Deborah Thomas, Plas Johnson  – soloist

Charts

References

External links
 

1979 albums
Leon Ware albums
Albums produced by Leon Ware